Prof. Dr. Eng. Nagia Essayed is a Libyan politician. She is Commissioner of Human Resources, Science and Technology for the African Union.

References

External links
 Nagia Essayed bio

Year of birth missing (living people)
Living people
African Union Commission members
Members of the Pan-African Parliament from Libya
Libyan women in politics
21st-century women politicians
Women members of the Pan-African Parliament